A signal passed at danger (SPAD), known in the United States as a stop signal overrun and in Canada as passing a stop signal, is an event on a railway where a train passes a stop signal without authority. In the United States and Canada, this may be known colloquially as running a red, though this idiom principally refers to automobiles passing red traffic signals.

The name derives from red colour light signals and horizontal semaphore signals in the United Kingdom, which are said to be at danger when they indicate that trains must stop (also known as the signal being on). This terminology is not used in North America where not all red signals indicate stop. In the UK, the alternative description signal passed at red (S.P.A.R.) is used where a signal changes to red in front of a train due to either a technical fault or in an emergency, such that the train is unable to stop before passing the signal despite being driven correctly.

Causes
Because of its high inertia, it takes a considerable distance to stop a train, and incidents of this type often involve a slight or very slight overrun of the signal, at low speed, because the driver has braked too late, often after sighting the signal too late.

In some situations, however, the driver is unaware that they have passed a signal at danger and so continues until a collision occurs, as in the Ladbroke Grove rail crash. In such cases it is up to the safety system (where fitted) to apply the brakes, or for the signaller to alert the driver.

Some of the causes are:

Misjudgement
Inattention
Distraction
Fatigue
Misreading of an adjacent signal due to line curvature, or sighting on one beyond
Misunderstanding
Miscommunication
Incomplete or lapsed route knowledge
Acute medical condition (medical emergency), such as a heart attack or stroke
Chronic medical condition, such as sleep apnea causing microsleep

Prevention

Automatic train protection 

Automatic train protection (ATP) is a much more advanced form of train stop which can regulate the speed of trains in many more situations other than at a stop signal. ATP supervises speed restrictions and distance to danger points. An ATP will also take into account the individual train characteristics such as brake performance. Thus, the ATP determines when brakes should be applied in order to stop the train before getting to the danger point. In the UK, only a small percentage of trains (Great Western Railway and Chiltern Railways) are fitted with this equipment.

Driver's reminder appliance 

The DRA is an inhibiting switch located on the driver's desk of United Kingdom passenger trains designed specifically to prevent 'starting away SPADs'. The driver is required to operate the DRA whenever the train is brought to a stand, either after passing a signal displaying caution or at a signal displaying danger.

Once applied, the DRA displays a red light and prevents traction power from being taken until the DRA is manually cancelled by the driver.

Collision prevention systems
Whilst the ideal safety system would prevent a SPAD from occurring, most equipment in current use does not stop the train before it has passed the Danger signal. However, provided that the train stops within the designated overlap beyond that signal, a collision should not occur.

Train stops 

On the London Underground (for example), mechanical train stops are fitted beside the track at signals to stop a train, should an S.P.A.D occur.

Train stops are also installed on main line railways in places where tripcock equipped trains run in extensive tunnels, such as the on the Northern City Line where the Automatic warning system and Train Protection & Warning System are not fitted.

Automatic Warning System

On the UK mainline, AWS consists of an on-board receiver/timer connected to the emergency braking system of a train, and magnets located in the center of the track. At each AWS site, a permanent magnet arms the system and an electromagnet connected to the green signal lamp disarms the system and a confirming chime is provided to the driver. If the receiver does not disarm within one second after arming, a warning tone sounds at the driver's desk and if it is not cancelled by the driver, the emergency brakes will be activated. A visual indication remains set to remind the driver that they have passed a restrictive signal aspect.

Train Protection & Warning System

On the UK mainline, TPWS consists of an on-board receiver/timer connected to the emergency braking system of a train, and radio frequency transmitter loops located on the track. The 'Overspeed Sensor System' pair of loops is located on the approach to the signal, and will activate the train's emergency brake if it approaches faster than the 'trigger speed' when the signal is at danger. The 'Train Stop System' pair of loops is located at the signal, and will activate the emergency brake if the train passes over them at any speed when the signal is at danger.

TPWS has proved to be an effective system in the UK, and has prevented several significant collisions. However, its deployment is not universal; only those signals where the risk of collision is considered to be significant are fitted with it.

Flank protection 
At certain junctions, especially where if the signal protecting the junction was passed at danger a side collision is likely to result, then flank protection may be used. Derailers and/or facing points beyond the signal protecting the junction will be set in such a position to allow a safe overlap if the signal was passed without authority. This effectively removes the chance of a side-impact collision as the train would be diverted in a parallel path to the approaching train.

SPAD indicators 

Prior to the introduction of TPWS in the UK, "SPAD indicators" were introduced at 'high risk' locations (for example: the entry to a single track section of line). Consisting of three red lamps, they are placed beyond the protecting stop signal and are normally unlit. If a driver passes the signal at 'danger', the top and bottom lamps flash red and the centre lamp is lit continuously. Whenever a SPAD indicator activates, all drivers who observe it are required to stop immediately, even if they can see that the signal pertaining to their own train is showing a proceed aspect. Since the introduction of TPWS, provision of new SPAD indicators has become less common.

UK acronyms: SPAD / SPAR

In the UK, incidents where a signal is passed at danger without authority are categorised according to principal cause. A SPAD is where the train proceeds beyond its authorised movement to an unauthorised movement. Other types are categorised as SPAR ("signal passed at red").

Prior to December 2012, the term "SPAD" applied to all such incidents, with a letter specifying cause. 

 A SPAD (formerly Category A SPAD) is where the train proceeds beyond its authorised movement to an unauthorised movement.
 A Technical SPAR (formerly Category B SPAD) is where the signal reverted to danger in front of the train due to an equipment failure or signaller error and the train was unable to stop before passing the signal.
 A Signaller SPAR (formerly Category C SPAD) is where the signal was replaced to danger in front of the train by the signaller in accordance with the rules and regulations and the train was unable to stop before passing the signal.
 A Runaway SPAR (formerly Category D SPAD) is where an unattended train or vehicles not attached to a traction unit run away past a signal at danger. Note that where this was the fault of the driver, this will be classed as a SPAD.

Some SPADs are defined as a;
 SAS SPAD – "Starting against signal" SPAD, where the train was standing at a danger signal and the driver moved past it.

 SOY SPAD – "Starting on yellow" SPAD, where the train started on a caution signal and the driver did not appreciate that the next signal would be at danger.

Passing signals at danger – with authority 
Signals form part of a complex system, and it is inevitable that faults may occur. They are designed to fail safe, so that when problems occur, the affected signal indicates danger (an example where this did not happen, known as a wrong-side failure, was the Clapham Junction rail crash due primarily to faulty wiring). To keep the network running, safety rules enable trains to pass signals that cannot be cleared to a proceed aspect. Provided that authority for the movement is obtained, a SPAD does not occur. There are two methods of obtaining that authority:

Driver obtains signaller's authority to pass a signal at danger
Once the train has been brought to a stand at a signal which is at danger, the driver should attempt to contact the signaller. If the signal cannot be cleared then the driver must obtain the signaller's authority to pass it at danger. Methods for contacting the signaller may include GSM-R cab radio, signal post telephone or mobile phone.

The signaller can authorise a driver to pass a signal at danger when:

 The signal is defective or disconnected
 The signal cannot be cleared because signalling or level crossing equipment has failed
 The signal is to be passed at danger for shunting purposes
 The signal cannot be cleared because a train or movement which has reversed is then required to start from beyond that signal
 An electric train is to pass the signal protecting an isolated section and proceed towards the limiting point
 A train has been accepted using restricted acceptance because the line is clear only up to the home signal of the next signal box and the section signal cannot be cleared
 In an emergency, and then only when authorised by the signal box supervisor or Operations Control, so that a train carrying passengers can enter an occupied section to use a station platform
 An engineering train is to move towards a possession, or leave a line under possession at an intermediate point
 A train is to pass the signal protecting engineering work to gain access to a station where the train is required to start back, or a line under single line working, or a siding
 The line is to be examined to check that it is clear
 A train is to proceed at caution through an absolute block section from the signal box in rear when a failed train has been removed
 A train is to enter the section after a train or vehicle that has proceeded without authority has been removed, or the front portion of a divided train has passed through the section
 A train is to enter the section to assist a failed train, evacuate passengers from a failed train, remove a portion of a divided train, or remove a train or vehicles that have proceeded without authority
 Single line working applies
 Working by pilotman or modified working applies

The driver and signaller must come to a clear understanding, and ensure they agree about how it is to be done. In the UK the signaller tells the driver of a specific train to pass a specific signal at danger, proceed with caution and travel at a speed that enables him to stop short of any obstruction, and then obey all other signals. If the signal is fitted with TPWS, the driver resets the Driver Reminder Appliance, pushes the TPWS Trainstop Override button in the cab, and proceeds cautiously through the section. If the train reaches the next signal without finding an obstruction, they must obey its aspect, at which point they can revert to normal working.

Driver passes a signal at danger under his own authority
If contact with the signaller cannot be made then the driver must not move the train, unless it is standing at one of the following signals:
 An Intermediate Block Home signal
 A signal controlled from a signal box that is closed
 An automatic signal where local instructions permit it, e.g. signals within tunnels on the Northern City Line.

After passing a signal at danger under his own authority, the driver must stop at the next signal (even if it is showing a proceed aspect) and inform the signaller of what they have done.

Accidents involving a signal passed at danger without authority 

  – Norwalk rail accident, 1853
  – Lewisham rail crash, 1857
  – St-Hilaire train disaster, 1864
  – Hexthorpe rail accident, 1887
  – 1897 Gentofte train crash, 1897
  – Potters Bar rail accidents, 1898
  – Slough rail accident, 1900
  – Washington DC train wreck, 1906
  – Tonbridge accident, 1909
  – Ais Gill disaster, 1913
  – Ilford rail crash, 1915
  – Herceghalom rail crash, 1916
  – Charfield railway disaster, 1928
  – Genthin rail disaster, 1939
  – Norton Fitzwarren rail crash, 1940
  – Eccles rail crash, 1941
  – Potters Bar rail accidents, 1946
  – Harrow and Wealdstone rail crash, 1952
  – Luton rail crash, 1955
  – Lewisham rail crash, 1957
  – Dagenham East rail crash, 1958
  – Newark Bay rail accident, 1958
  – Coppenhall Junction railway accident, 1962
  – Harmelen train disaster, 1962
  – Marden rail crash, 1969
  – Violet Town railway disaster, 1969 
  – Paisley Gilmour Street rail accident, 1979
  – Invergowrie rail accident, 1979
  – Philadelphia Conrail West Chester Branch collision, 1979
  – Otłoczyn railway accident, 1980
  – Wembley Central rail crash, 1984
  – Eccles rail crash, 1984
  – Hinton train collision, 1986
  – Colwich rail crash, 1986
  – Chase train collision, 1987
  – Glasgow Bellgrove rail crash, 1989
  – Purley station rail crash, 1989
  – Rüsselsheim train disaster, 1990
  – Shigaraki train disaster, 1991
  – Newton rail accident, 1991
  – Cowden rail crash, 1994
  – Toronto subway accident, 1995
  – Garmisch-Partenkirchen train collision, 1995
  – Secaucus Train Collision, 1996
  – Silver Spring train collision, 1996
  – Hines Hill train collision, 1996
  – Southall rail crash, 1997
  – Beresfield rail disaster, 1997 
  – Suonenjoki rail collision, 1998
  – Spa Road Junction rail crash, 1999
  – Winsford railway accident, 1999
  – Ladbroke Grove rail crash, 1999
  – Åsta accident, 2000
  – Pécrot, 2001
  – Norton Bridge rail crash, 2003
  – Qalyoub rail accident, 2006
  – Arnhem, 2006
  – Chatsworth train collision, 2008
  – Halle train collision, 2010
  – Badarwas train collision, 2010
  – Petarukan train collision, 2010
  – Saxony-Anhalt train accident, 2011
  – Sloterdijk train collision, 2012
  – Goodwell, Oklahoma, 2012
  – Granges-près-Marnand, 2013
  – Cotești, 2014
  – Hermalle-sous-Huy train collision, 2016
  – Soure train crash, 2020
 – Salisbury rail crash, 2021

Accidents following a signal passed at danger with authority 
Whenever a signal is passed at danger the driver is required to "proceed with caution, stop short of any obstructions, and drive at speed that will enable you to stop within the distance which you can see to be clear". Failure to do this has caused the following collisions:
 
  – Roseville, 1950
  – Stratford (London Underground), 1953
  – Coppenhall Junction, 1962
  – Wrawby Junction, 1983
  – Glenbrook, 1999
  – Vittorio Emanuele (Rome Metro), 2006

Accidents where the signaller incorrectly authorised a driver to pass a signal at danger
Except where permissive working is in use, interlocking usually prevents a train from being signalled into a section that is already occupied. When operational needs require it, this can be overridden, and provided it is carried out in accordance with the rules this is a safe practice. However, failure to follow protocol can result in a collision:
  – Nashville, TN, 1918
  – Bucerdea, 1968 
  – Castlecary rail accidents, 1968
  – Seer Green, 1981
  – Jakarta, 1987
   – Zoufftgen, 2006
  – Szczekociny, 2012
  – Bad Aibling, 2016
  – Thessaly, 2023

See also 
 Ding-ding, and away, British slang for a guard incorrectly giving permission to a driver to start away from a platform against a red signal.

References

External links 
 Office of Rail Regulation
 UK Health and Safety Exec, Retrieved 8 March 2006.

 
Railway accidents and incidents